Three ships in the United States Navy have been named USS Richmond for the capital of Virginia.

  was a brig, launched and purchased for the Navy in 1798. She was sold in 1801.
  was wooden steam sloop-of-war, launched in 1860. She served in the American Civil War and later as a receiving ship. She was finally stricken from the Naval Vessel Register in 1919.
  was launched  in 1921, saw service in World War II and decommissioned in 1945.

See also
 
 , a Confederate ram.

United States Navy ship names